Gamochaeta argyrinea, the silvery cudweed or silvery everlasting, is a North American species of flowering plant in the family Asteraceae. It is widespread across the southeastern and south-central United States from Delaware south to Florida and west as far as southeastern Kansas and central Texas. It has also been found in Puerto Rico and in northern California (probably introduced).

The plant forms many small flower heads in elongated arrays. Each head contains 4–6 purple or yellow-brown disc flowers but no ray flowers.

References

External links
photo of herbariun specimen at Missouri Botanical Garden, collected in Missouri in 1992

argyrinea
Flora of the United States
Plants described in 2004